In geometry, a generalized polygon can be called a polygram, and named specifically by its number of sides. All polygons are polygrams, but can also include disconnected sets of edges, called a compound polygon. For example, a regular pentagram, {5/2}, has 5 sides, and the regular hexagram, {6/2} or 2{3}, has 6 sides divided into two triangles.

A regular polygram {p/q} can either be in a set of regular star polygons (for gcd(p,q) = 1, q > 1) or in a set of regular polygon compounds (if gcd(p,q) > 1).

Etymology
The polygram names combine a numeral prefix, such as penta-, with the Greek suffix -gram (in this case generating the word pentagram). The prefix is normally a Greek cardinal, but synonyms using other prefixes exist. The -gram suffix derives from γραμμῆς (grammos) meaning a line.

Generalized regular polygons

A regular polygram, as a general regular polygon, is denoted by its Schläfli symbol {p/q}, where p and q are relatively prime (they share no factors) and q ≥ 2. For integers p and q, it can be considered as being constructed by connecting every qth point out of p points regularly spaced in a circular placement.

Regular compound polygons 

In other cases where n and m have a common factor, a polygram is interpreted as a lower polygon, {n/k, m/k}, with k = gcd(n,m), and rotated copies are combined as a compound polygon. These figures are called regular compound polygons.

See also
List of regular polytopes and compounds#Stars

References

Cromwell, P.; Polyhedra, CUP, Hbk. 1997, . Pbk. (1999), . p. 175
Grünbaum, B. and G.C. Shephard; Tilings and Patterns, New York: W. H. Freeman & Co., (1987), .
Grünbaum, B.; Polyhedra with Hollow Faces, Proc of NATO-ASI Conference on Polytopes ... etc. (Toronto 1993), ed T. Bisztriczky et al., Kluwer Academic (1994) pp. 43–70.
John H. Conway, Heidi Burgiel, Chaim Goodman-Strass, The Symmetries of Things 2008,  (Chapter 26. pp. 404: Regular star-polytopes Dimension 2)
 Robert Lachlan, An Elementary Treatise on Modern Pure Geometry. London: Macmillan, 1893, p. 83 polygrams. 
 Branko Grünbaum, Metamorphoses of polygons, published in The Lighter Side of Mathematics: Proceedings of the Eugène Strens Memorial Conference on Recreational Mathematics and its History, (1994)

Types of polygons
Star symbols